Donacosa is a genus of spiders in the family Lycosidae. It was first described in 1991 by Alderweireldt & Jocqué. , it contains only one species, Donacosa merlini, found in Spain.

References

Lycosidae
Monotypic Araneomorphae genera